Onchiam, also spelled Onchyam is a village in Kozhikode district in the state of Kerala, India.

Demographics
 India census, Onchiam had a population of 26697 with 12,504 males and 14,193 females.

Transportation
Onchium connects to other parts of India through Vatakara on the west and Kuttiady on the east. National highway No.66 passes through Vatakara and the northern stretch connects to Mangalore, Goa and Mumbai.  The southern stretch connects to Cochin and Trivandrum.  The eastern Highway going through Kuttiady connects to Mananthavady, Mysore and Bangalore. The nearest airports are at Kannur and Kozhikode.  The nearest railway station is at Vatakara.

See also
 Madappally, Vatakara
 Orkkatteri
 Azhiyur
 Vatakara

References

Villages in Kozhikode district
Vatakara area